The Our Lady of Seven Sorrows Cathedral or just Kisantu Cathedral is a religious building belonging to the Catholic Church and is located in the town of Kisantu,  south of Kinshasa, the capital of the African country of Democratic Republic of the Congo.

The building Tuscan-inspired was built between 1926 and 1936 and previously worked there the old mission of Belgian Jesuits in Lower Congo established in 1893. Now the temple follows the Roman or Latin rite and serves as the headquarters diocese of Kisantu (Dioecesis Kisantuensis) which was created in 1959 by Pope John XXIII with the bull Cum parvulum.

In 2011, he finished his last restoration. It is one of the main attractions of the city along with the Botanical Garden of Kisantu.

See also
Roman Catholicism in the Democratic Republic of the Congo
Cathedral Basilica of Our Lady of Seven Sorrows

References

Roman Catholic cathedrals in the Democratic Republic of the Congo
Kisantu
Roman Catholic churches completed in 1936
20th-century Roman Catholic church buildings in the Democratic Republic of the Congo